The Power Station Years: The Unreleased Recordings, first released as John Bongiovi: The Power Station Years, is a compilation of previously unreleased songs recorded by vocalist/guitarist Jon Bon Jovi (then known by his given name of John Bongiovi) that was first released as a 10-track compilation in 1998. They were recorded in the early 1980s at The Power Station recording studio, where John worked as a janitor.

Recordings
The songs were recorded prior to the formation of the now-famous band, Bon Jovi. The album has been reissued several times since in a 14-track version and the latest 20-track edition, released on 18 September 2001. The albums were produced and released by Tony Bongiovi – Jon's father's first cousin. The albums are unofficial and were originally released under the "Masquerade" record label and have been re-released with different packaging on several occasions, including as Hollywood Dreams on 9 July 2018.

"More Than We Bargained For" was released as a promotional single for the album but is very rare.

The song "Bobby's Girl" is about Jon's wife Dorothea Hurley. Dorothea was dating Jon's best friend Bobby at the time Jon and Dorothea first met.

The most notable song on the album is an instrumental version of the song "Runaway" (although it was not available on all releases), which went on to reach number 39 on the Billboard Hot 100 in 1984.

Track listing

1998 version
"Who Said It Would Last Forever" (Bon Jovi, Jim Polles)
"Open Your Heart"
"Stringin' a Line" (Ian Thomas)
"Don't Leave Me Tonight"
"Hollywood Dreams" (Bon Jovi, Polles)
"Don't You Believe Him"
"More Than We Bargained For" (Bon Jovi, Polles)
"Head Over Heels"
"What You Want"
"Talkin' in Your Sleep" (Bon Jovi, George Karakoglou)

1999 version
"Who Said It Would Last Forever" 
"Open Your Heart"
"Stringin' a Line" 
"Don't Leave Me Tonight"
"More Than We Bargained For" 
"For You"
"Hollywood Dreams"
"All Talk, No Action"
"Don't Keep Me Wondering"
"Head Over Heels"
"No One Does It Like You"
"What You Want"
"Don't You Believe Him"
"Talkin' in Your Sleep"

2001 version
 "Who Said It Would Last Forever" – 4:01
 "Open Your Heart" – 3:46
 "Stringin' a Line" – 3:46
 "Don't Leave Me Tonight" – 4:53
 "More Than We Bargained For"  – 3:49
 "For You" – 3:04
 "Hollywood Dreams" – 3:16
 "All Talk, No Action" – 3:29
 "Don't Keep Me Wondering" – 2:57
 "Head Over Heels" – 3:31
 "No One Does It Like You" – 4:14
 "What You Want" – 3:32
 "Don't You Believe Him" – 3:13
 "Talkin' in Your Sleep" – 4:20
 "Bobby's Girl" – 1:39
 "Gimme Some Lovin' Charlene" – 2:29
 "Don't Do That to Me Anymore" – 3:47
 "This Woman Is Dangerous" – 4:08
 "Maybe Tomorrow" – 3:32
 "Runaway" (instrumental demo) (Bon Jovi, George Karakoglou) – 3:39

Personnel

Musicians
Jon Bon Jovi – vocals, guitars, piano, percussion
Bill Frank – lead guitar
Jim McGrath – drums
Charlie Mills – drums
David Rashbaum – background vocals, keyboards, piano
Mick Seeley – bass guitar, background vocals
Rick Cyr – saxophone, organ

Production
 Tony Bongiovi	– producer, original engineering
 Rocco Raffa (AKA Steve Marinaccio) – mixing
 Roy Hendrickson – mixing
 Jason Corsaro	– mixing
 Scott Litt – original engineering
 Ron Winter – executive producer (1998)
 Lee Rumble – engineering (1998)
 Prime CDs, London – 1998 mastering
 The Creative Tank – sleeve design

References

Jon Bon Jovi albums
1998 compilation albums
Mercury Records compilation albums